Molley Corner is a point on the north side of Rohss Bay, James Ross Island, Antarctica,  east of Cape Obelisk.

References

Headlands of James Ross Island